The Baptist Missionary Association Theological Seminary (BMATS or BMA Theological Seminary) is an institution in Jacksonville, Texas, owned and operated by the Baptist Missionary Association of America.  It is located off Texas State Highway 135 on the northeast side of Jacksonville.

The BMA Theological Seminary Divisions of Graduate and Undergraduate Studies are accredited by the Commission on Colleges of the Southern Association of Colleges and Schools) to award the Associate of Divinity, Bachelor of Arts in Religion, Master of Arts (Religion), Master of Arts in Church Ministries, and Master of Divinity degrees.  The SACS institutional accreditation is used by BMA Seminary to determine institutional eligibility for Federal Student Aid. BMA Seminary (Graduate Studies Division) is accredited by the Association of Theological Schools in the United States and Canada to award the Master of Divinity and the Master of Arts in Church Ministries degrees. BMA Seminary is a member of the Council of Southwestern Theological Schools, the Forest Trail Library Consortium, and the American Theological Library Association.

Gallery

References

Seminaries and theological colleges in Texas
Baptist organizations established in the 20th century
Independent Baptist seminaries and theological colleges in the United States
Universities and colleges accredited by the Southern Association of Colleges and Schools
Educational institutions established in 1955
Education in Cherokee County, Texas
1955 establishments in Texas